Porter Township may refer to:

Arkansas 
 Porter Township, Crawford County, Arkansas, in Crawford County, Arkansas

Indiana 
 Porter Township, Porter County, Indiana

Michigan 
 Porter Township, Cass County, Michigan
 Porter Township, Midland County, Michigan
 Porter Township, Van Buren County, Michigan

North Dakota 
 Porter Township, Dickey County, North Dakota

Ohio 
 Porter Township, Delaware County, Ohio 
 Porter Township, Scioto County, Ohio

Pennsylvania 
 Porter Township, Clarion County, Pennsylvania
 Porter Township, Clinton County, Pennsylvania
 Porter Township, Huntingdon County, Pennsylvania
 Porter Township, Jefferson County, Pennsylvania
 Porter Township, Lycoming County, Pennsylvania
 Porter Township, Pike County, Pennsylvania
 Porter Township, Schuylkill County, Pennsylvania

Township name disambiguation pages